30 September 2004 Baghdad bombing was a series of bombings targeting U.S. soldiers handing out sweets to the Iraqi children at the celebration during the opening of a water treatment plant in the Amil District of Baghdad. The bombings killed at least 41, including 35 children, and wounded 131, including 10 U.S. soldiers.

US Army units attacked were from Comanche Troop 1st Squadron 7th Cavalry 1st Cavalry Division. Troopers from Apache Troop 1st Squadron 7th Cavalry were dispatched as quick reaction force (QRF) from FOB Falcon.

Perpetrators 
Zarqawi's group Jama'at al-Tawhid wal-Jihad claimed responsibility for attacks that day, but it is unclear if these include these explosions that killed the children.

It is unclear whether the U.S. troops or the crowds were the prime target. A statement hailing "heroic operations" was posted in the name of Abu Musab al-Zarqawi.

References

External links
Children massacred by Iraq bombs BBC News
Dozens of children killed in bomb attack in Baghdad CBC News

2004 murders in Iraq
21st-century mass murder in Iraq
Terrorist incidents in Iraq in 2004
Car and truck bombings in Iraq
Mass murder in 2004
Terrorist incidents in Baghdad
2000s in Baghdad
Terrorist attacks attributed to al-Qaeda in Iraq
September 2004 events in Iraq